The nominees for the 2007 Ovation Awards were announced on September 24, 2007.  The awards were presented for excellence in stage productions in the Los Angeles area from September 1, 2006 to August 31, 2007 based upon evaluations from members of the Los Angeles theater community.

The winners were announced on November 12, 2007 in a ceremony hosted by Neil Patrick Harris at the Orpheum Theatre in downtown Los Angeles, California.

Board of Governors Awards 
The Los Angeles Stage Alliance presented three non-competitive awards for meritorious service to theater in Los Angeles.  The Board of Governors Award for Career Achievement was given to Annette Bening.  The James A. Doolittle Leadership in Theatre Award was given to the Community Redevelopment Agency of the City of Los Angeles.  And The Actors Fund was honored with the Community Outreach Award.

Awards 
Winners are listed first and highlighted in boldface.

References 

Ovation Awards
Ovation
2007 in California
2007 awards in the United States